Douako is a town and sub-prefecture in the Kouroussa Prefecture in the Kankan Region of eastern-central Guinea. As of 2014 it had a population of 23,416 people.

As of 2014, the population has slightly more females than males, with around 53.3% of its population being female. The town also has a slightly more young population, with 51.5% being 0–14 years old. Urbanization is almost non existent, with 100% of the town being rural.

References

Sub-prefectures of the Kankan Region